Meadowridge Common is an  reserve in the Meadowridge suburb of Cape Town, South Africa, which preserves a fragment of critically endangered Cape Flats Sand Fynbos vegetation.

The preserve contains over a hundred plant species, including 4 that are endangered. The endangered Cape Rain Frog (Breviceps gibbosus) is one of the many small animals that have been seen here. In spring, the park becomes very colourful as the indigenous fynbos bursts into flower. 

This small reserve is managed by the City of Cape Town, but faces considerable challenges. Not least of which are invasive alien plants such as Pine trees and Kikuyu grass. The reserve’s small size and isolation from other natural areas also make species extinction a much greater risk.

See also
 Biodiversity of Cape Town
 List of nature reserves in Cape Town
 Cape Flats Sand Fynbos

References

 

Nature reserves in Cape Town
Protected areas of the Western Cape
Meadowridge